The following article is a summary of the 2015–16 football season in Belgium, which is the 113th season of competitive football in the country and runs from July 2015 until June 2016.

Promotion and relegation

Pre-season

National teams

Belgium national football team

UEFA Euro 2016 qualifying

UEFA Euro 2016

Friendlies

Belgium women's national football team

2017 UEFA Women's European Championship qualification

Group 7

Algarve Cup

Friendly

League competitions

Belgian First Division

Regular season

Championship play-offs

Belgian Second Division

Due to a reform in the Belgian football league, the Belgian Second Division ceases to exist and is replaced by the Belgian First Division B from the 2016–17 season which will only contain 8 teams instead of the current 17. As a result, the bottom nine teams in the league are set to relegate to the newly created league at the third level of the Belgian football pyramid, the Belgian First Amateur Division. Due to the fact that WS Brussels did not receive a licence, they were relegated instead of Roeselare.

Belgian Third Division

Due to a reform in the Belgian football league, the Belgian Third Division ceases to exist and is replaced by the Belgian Second Amateur Division from the 2016–17 season, now at the fourth level of Belgian football. A newly created league, the Belgian First Amateur Division is formed at the third level, effectively pushing the teams in this division one level down the pyramid. Only the top two teams in each division and the two promotion playoff winners are "promoted" to the new league, meaning they will remain at the third level, while most of the teams effectively drop to the fourth level. The two teams finishing in last position in each group are relegated to the Belgian Third Amateur Division, which in fact means a drop from level 3 to level 5 of the pyramid.

Group A

Group B

Promotion play-offs
The eight teams taking part in the promotion play-offs are playing to win one of the three remaining places in the 2016-17 Belgian First Amateur Division. The final match between the winners of Round 2, Sprimont-Comblain and FCV Dender EH, was not played as both teams already achieved promotion by winning Round 2. Hasselt beat La Louvière Centre in the third place match and took the final promotion spot. The five losing teams will play in the 2016-17 Belgian Second Amateur Division, effectively one level lower than in the 2015–16 season.

Transfers

European Club results
Champions Gent qualified directly for the group stage of the Champions League, while runners-up Club Brugge started in the qualifying rounds. As third-place finisher, Anderlecht qualified directly for the group stage of the Europa League, while Standard Liège and Charleroi started in the qualifying rounds.

Other honours

European qualification for 2016–17 summary

See also
 2015–16 Belgian Pro League
 2015–16 Belgian Cup
 2015 Belgian Super Cup
 Belgian Second Division
 Belgian Third Division: divisions A and B
 Belgian Promotion: divisions A, B, C and D

References

 
2015 in association football
2016 in association football